Xanthosphaera is a genus of beetles belonging to the family Leiodidae.

Species:
 Xanthosphaera barnevillii Fairmaire, 1859

References

Leiodidae